外交部 may refer to:
Ministry of Foreign Affairs of the People's Republic of China
Ministry of Foreign Affairs (Singapore)
Ministry of Foreign Affairs (South Korea)
Ministry of Foreign Affairs (Taiwan)